Aleutic may refer to:

 Aleutic people or Aleuts, a people who live in the transition zone between Russia and Alaska, and the Bering Sea area
 Aleutic language or Aleutic, the language of the Aleuts
 Aleutic Islands (Aleutics), aka Aleutian Islands, an archipelago linking Alaska to Kamchatka, the southern bound of the Bering Sea
 Alaska Peninsula aka Aleutic Peninsula, a peninsula that links mainland Alaska to the Aleutian Islands
 Aleutsky District or Aleutic District, Kamchatka Krai, Russian Far East, Russia

See also

 
 Alutiiq people, a people found on the Aleutic-Alaska Peninsula and Kodiak Island Archipelago
 Alutiiq language, the language spoken by the Alutiiq people